SHAPE is a Danish mobile design and development agency based in Copenhagen and founded in 2010 by current partners CEO Christian Risom, Creative Director Nicolas Thomsen, and the two Senior Developers Ole Gammelgaard and Philip Bruce. SHAPE focus on developing applications for mobile phones and handheld devices.

In 2011, SHAPE founded Danish App Awards, the official award show celebrating Danish apps.

SHAPE also functions as experts for The Economist.

Apps
SHAPE has created apps for brands such as:
 Songkick – a concert calendar for iPhone
 WhoSampled – Analyze the DNA of your music tracks
 Appoday  - The One App to Free Them All
 Telia
 Gyldendal
 eBay
 Fitness World
 Ritzau
 Arriva
 Nykredit

References

External links
SHAPE website

Software companies of Denmark
Mobile game companies
Software companies based in Copenhagen
Companies based in Copenhagen Municipality

da:SHAPE